Summer Adventure Tag League is an annual professional wrestling tag team tournament held in the Japanese promotion Dragon Gate since 2007. It features a round-robin first round, after which the top four teams participate in the single-elimination portion to crown the winner. Naruki Doi and Masato Yoshino, used the prize money from the first tournament to establish the Dragon Gate Open the Twin Gate Championship. The 2011 version featured a single-elimination tournament, while the 2012 version featured tag teams consisting of three people.

Results

List of winners
2007: Naruki Doi and Masato Yoshino
2008: Naruki Doi and Masato Yoshino
2009: Shingo Takagi and YAMATO
2010: Naruki Doi and Masato Yoshino
2011: Akira Tozawa and BxB Hulk
2012: Akira Tozawa, BxB Hulk and "Naoki Tanisaki"
2013: Eita and T-Hawk
2014: Jimmy Kagetora and Jimmy Susumu
2015: Jimmy K-ness J.K.S. and Jimmy Susumu
2016: Dragon Kid and Eita

2007
The 2007 Summer Adventure League featured ten teams, and was held from 5 August to 26 August. The top four ranked teams from the round robin round qualified for the single-elimination semi-finals. The two winners of the semi-finals met in the final to decide the winner.

Knockout round

2008
The 2008 Summer Adventure League featured nine teams, and was held from 9 August to 28 August. The top four ranked teams from the round robin round qualified for the single-elimination semi-finals. The two winners of the semi-finals met in the final to decide the winner.

Knockout round

2009
The 2009 Summer Adventure League featured nine teams, and was held from 1 August to 26 August. The top four ranked teams from the round robin round qualified for the single-elimination semi-finals. The two winners of the semi-finals met in the final to decide the winner.

Knockout round

2010
The 2010 Summer Adventure League featured ten teams, and was held from 30 July to 25 August. The round robin round featured two blocks of five teams each, and the top two teams from each block qualified for the single-elimination semi-finals. The two winners of the semi-finals met in the final to decide the winner.

Knockout round

2011
The 2011 Summer Adventure League featured twelve teams, and was held from 3 August to 7 August, covering three shows; the format of the League was changed to a single-elimination tournament. Four teams received a bye into the second round. Kotoka qualified to be Don Fujii's partner by beating Shisa BOY, Super Shenlong and Eita Kobayashi.

2012
The 2012 Summer Adventure League featured eight teams with three members instead of the usual two. The round robin round features two blocks of four teams each, and the top team from each block will qualify for the finals to decide the winner of the tournament while the last team from each block will face each other to determine the last placed team. Super Shenlong III qualified to be Shingo Takagi and YAMATO's partner by beating Chihiro Tominaga. The tournament was held from 2 August to 19 August.

Mondai Ryu, Kzy and Cyber Kong lost to Ryo "Jimmy" Saito, Genki Horiguchi H.A.Gee.Mee!! and Naoki Tanizaki in 16:31 to become the last placed team

Akira Tozawa, BxB Hulk and "Naoki Tanisaki" pinned CIMA, Gamma and Magnitude Kishiwada in 23:21 to become champions

2013
The 2013 Summer Adventure League reverted to teams of two members, and was held from 7 September to 28 September. The round robin round featured two blocks of four teams each, and the top team from each block qualified for the finals. The Block A match between Shingo Takagi and Akira Tozawa versus Naruki Doi and Masato Yoshino ended in a no contest with no points awarded when Doi turned on Yoshino and joined Mad Blankey. This caused Yoshino to team up with the Former Super Shenlong III: Yosuke Watanabe for his final Block A match against Masaaki Mochizuki and Don Fujii.

T-Hawk and Eita defeated Yamato and BxB Hulk in 19:26 to become the interim Open the Twin Gate Champions.

2014
The 2014 Summer Adventure Tag League and was held from 5 September to 23 September. The round robin round featured two blocks of four teams each, and the top team from each block qualified for the finals. During the tournament Kotoka was injured on their last match and was replaced by Yuga Hayashi.

Ryotsu Shimizu and Yuga Hayashi lost to Kzy and Naruki Doi in 11:53 to become the last placed team

2015
The 2015 Summer Adventure Tag League and was held from 5 September to 27 September. The round robin round featured two blocks of four teams each, and the top team from each block qualified for the finals. On September 9 Cima was injured and was replaced by Takehiro Yamamura. 

Knockout round

2016
On July 7 it was announced the 2016 Summer Adventure Tag League and it will be held from August 6 to September 10. The round robin round featured two blocks of six teams each, and the top team from each block qualified for the finals. On July 24 it was announced that Kotoka would miss the tournament due to facial injuries and Cyber Kong will replace him as Shingo Takagi's place and Osaka06 (CIMA and Gamma) replaced the team of Mondai Ryu and Cyber Kong.

Knockout round

References

External links
Dragon Gate official site in Japanese

Dragon Gate (wrestling)
Tag team tournaments